Iddy Nado (born 3 November 1995) is a Tanzanian professional footballer who plays as a midfielder for Azam F.C. of the Tanzanian Premier League.

References 

Living people
1995 births
Tanzanian footballers
Azam F.C. players
Association football midfielders
Tanzania international footballers